Ernest "Ernie" "Big Hoss" Warlick (July 21, 1932 – November 24, 2012) was a tight end from North Carolina Central University who played American collegiate and Professional Football as well as Canadian Professional Football.

Warlick was born in Hickory, North Carolina. After starring at Ridgeview High School and then North Carolina Central, he played 4 seasons with the Calgary Stampeders of the Canadian Football League.  He then joined the American Football League's Buffalo Bills in 1962.  He had an average of 17.2 yds/catch with the Bills, while the team earned three straight Eastern Division titles and two American Football League championships, and a 20.8 yds/catch average in 1964.  In 1964, he helped the Bills win their first AFL championship game against the San Diego Chargers, 20-7, when he caught two passes for 41 yards.  In the 1965 AFL championship game, when offensive linemen Billy Shaw and Dave Behrman were injured, Warlick helped bolster the Bills' offensive blocking in a double tight end offense. In that game, he also scored the first touchdown in the Bills' 23-0 victory over the Chargers, on an 18-yard pass from quarterback Jack Kemp.

He was selected to the American Football League All-Star Team every year he was in the league, in 1962, '63, '64, and '65.  He was the first African-American sportscaster on Buffalo television, was elected to the Buffalo Broadcast Pioneers Hall of Fame in 1998, and received the Ralph C. Wilson Jr. Distinguished Service Award in 2000.  In 2005, Warlick was inducted to North Carolina's Central Intercollegiate Athletic Association Hall of Fame, honoring his basketball and football accomplishments at North Carolina Central.

See also
Other American Football League players

References

External links
Just Sports Stats

1932 births
2012 deaths
American football tight ends
Calgary Stampeders players
Buffalo Bills players
American Football League All-Star players
North Carolina Central Eagles football players
People from Washington, D.C.
African-American players of American football
African-American players of Canadian football
American Football League players
20th-century African-American sportspeople
21st-century African-American people